Cystoidea is a class of extinct crinozoan echinoderms, termed cystoids, that lived attached to the sea floor by stalks. They existed during the Paleozoic Era, in the Middle Ordovician and Silurian Periods, until their extinction in the Devonian Period.

Description
Cystoids are distinguished from other echinoderms by triangular pore openings.

Superficially, cystoids resembled crinoids, but they had an ovoid, rather than cup-shaped, body. The mouth was at the upper pole of the body, with the opposite end attached to the substratum, often by a stalk, although some stalkless species did exist. The anus lay on the side of the body.

Five, or less commonly three, ambulacral areas ran along the outside of the body, radiating outwards from the mouth. A number of small tentacles either surrounded the mouth, or projected outwards in a row from the ambulacral areas, depending on species.

The most distinctive feature of cystoids  was the presence of a number of pores in the rigid skeleton encasing the body. These were most likely respiratory in nature, allowing fluid to flow in or out of the body. In some species, the pores were clustered in distinct regions, but in others they were distributed quite widely over the body surface. See also List of echinodermata orders.

See also

References

 
Paleozoic echinoderms
Ordovician echinoderms
Silurian echinoderms
Devonian echinoderms
Middle Ordovician first appearances
Devonian extinctions
Prehistoric echinoderms of Europe
Prehistoric echinoderms of North America